Alex Lemon (born in 1978) is an American poet and memoirist.

Lemon is the author of five books:    The poetry collections Mosquito (Tin House Books 2006), Hallelujah Blackout (Milkweed Editions 2008), Fancy Beasts (Milkweed Editions 2010), and The Wish Book (Milkweed Editions 2014) and Happy: A Memoir (Scribner 2010).

Lemon is an editor-at-large for Saturnalia Books; poetry editor of descant, TCU's literary journal, sits on the editorial board of TCU Press and The Southern Review's advisory board.  His awards and honors include a 2005 Literature Fellowship in Poetry from the National Endowment for the Arts, a 2006 Minnesota Arts Board Grant, and inclusion in the Best American Poetry 2008 anthology. He lives in Fort Worth, Texas and teaches at Texas Christian University.

Lemon's works are in 544 libraries, according to WorldCat.

Bibliography 
2006 — Mosquito. Tin House Books.  
2008 — Hallelujah Blackout. Milkweed Editions.  
2010 — Happy. Scribner.   
2010 — Fancy Beasts. Milkweed Editions.  
2014 — The Wish Book. Milkweed Editions. 
2017 — Feverland: A Memoir in Shards. Milkweed Editions. 
2019 — Another Last Day. Milkweed Editions.

References

External links 
 Alex Lemon's Website
https://web.archive.org/web/20081202225543/http://www.indigestmag.com/lemon1.htm
 Mosquito at Tin House Books
A Visit to Planet Lemtron - Alex Lemon's column in InDigest Magazine
 Milkweed Editions
An Interview with Alex Lemon and musician Chris Koza

Living people
21st-century American poets
1978 births